Bâcleș is a commune located in Mehedinți County, Romania. It is composed of seven villages: Bâcleș, Corzu, Giura, Petra, Podu Grosului, Seliștiuța and Smadovița. It is situated in the historical region of Oltenia.

References

Communes in Mehedinți County
Localities in Oltenia